Scott R. Beal (April 14, 1890 – July 10, 1973) was a film assistant director.

Born in Quinnesec, Michigan, he was the son of Frank Beal. He began his career as an actor in 1915, before switching to the other side of the camera the following year. He also occasionally doubled up as a production manager and a cinematographer.

As an assistant director, he worked on Tod Browning's Dracula (1931) and Robert Florey's Murders in the Rue Morgue (1932).

Selected filmography
Torment (1924)
Classified (1925)
Her Sister from Paris (1925); assistant director

References

External links
 
 

1890 births
1973 deaths
People from Dickinson County, Michigan
American male film actors
Best Assistant Director Academy Award winners
Film directors from Michigan
20th-century American male actors